Pueblo de Viudas (Spanish for widow's town) is a Chilean village, currently part of urban Pichilemu, Cardenal Caro Province, O'Higgins Region.

Populated places in Pichilemu